Murzinarctia is a monotypic moth genus in the subfamily Arctiinae. Its only species, Murzinarctia murzini, is known from the Chinese province of Yunnan. Both the genus and species were first described by Vladimir Viktorovitch Dubatolov in 2005.

References

  (2005) "Description of new taxa of tiger moths from China, with some synonymic notes (Lepidoptera, Arctiidae)". Atalanta. 36 (3/4): 526-537, colour plates 13-14, Würzburg.

Spilosomina
Monotypic moth genera
Moths of Asia